No Blues is an album by American jazz pianist Horace Parlan featuring performances recorded in 1975 and released on the Danish-based  SteepleChase label.

Reception
The AllMusic review awarded the album 4 stars.

Track listing
 "No Blues" (Miles Davis) – 6:13
 "My Foolish Heart" (Ned Washington, Victor Young) – 4:57
 "Have You Met Miss Jones?" (Lorenz Hart, Richard Rodgers) – 5:07
 "A Theme for Ahmad" (Horace Parlan) – 5:30
 "Hi-Fly" (Randy Weston) – 8:03
 "West of Eden" (Austin Wells) – 6:12
 "Holy Land" (Cedar Walton) – 6:42
 "Darn That Dream" (Eddie DeLange, Jimmy Van Heusen) – 4:43

Personnel
Horace Parlan – piano 
Niels-Henning Ørsted Pedersen – bass
Tony Inzalaco – drums

References

SteepleChase Records albums
Horace Parlan albums
1976 albums